Bug algorithm is a class of algorithm that helps robots deal with motion planning.

Basic assumptions 
The robot is treated as a point inside a 2D world.
The obstacles (if any) are unknown and nonconvex.
There are clearly defined starting point and goal.
The robot is able to detect obstacle boundary from a distance of known length. 
The robot always knows the direction and how far (in terms of Euclidean distance) it is from the goal.

Algorithm 
The most basic form of Bug algorithm (Bug 1) is as follows:
The robot moves towards the goal until an obstacle is encountered.
Follow a canonical direction (clockwise) until the robot reaches the location of initial encounter with the obstacle (in short, walking around the obstacle).
The robot then follows the obstacle's boundary to reach the point on the boundary that is closest to the goal.
Go back to step 1. Repeat this until the goal is reached.

See also 
Pathfinding
Motion planning

Reference 

Robot kinematics